CBL Properties (previously CBL & Associates, Inc., then CBL & Associates Properties, Inc.) is an American real estate investment trust that invests in shopping centers, primarily in the Southeastern and Midwestern United States. The company is organized in Delaware with its headquarters in Chattanooga, Tennessee. The company's largest tenants are L Brands (4.25% of revenue), Signet Jewelers (2.87% of revenue), and Foot Locker (2.78% of revenue).

The company's name is based on the initials of its founder, Charles B. Lebovitz.

History
In 1961, Moses Lebovitz, his son, Charles B. Lebovitz, and Jay Solomon founded Independent Enterprises. In 1970, the company merged with Arlen Realty & Development Corporation, which owned shopping centers on the East Coast of the United States. In 1978, Charles B. Lebovitz and five associates formed CBL & Associates, Inc. In March 1979, the company built its first mall, the Plaza del Sol Mall in Del Rio, Texas. In 1987, the company built Hamilton Place in Chattanooga, its flagship mall. In 1993, CBL & Associates Properties, Inc. was formed as a REIT and acquired all of the assets of CBL & Associates, Inc. The company became a public company via an initial public offering.

In 1995, the company acquired two shopping malls, WestGate Mall in Spartanburg, South Carolina and Suburban Plaza in Knoxville, Tennessee, for $32.3 million. In 1998, the company acquired five properties near Nashville, Tennessee for $247.4 million in cash and securities. It also acquired Meridian Mall and Janesville Mall for $68 million in cash and $52 million in partnership units. In 2001, the company acquired a 23-property portfolio from Richard E. Jacobs for $1.3 billion. In March 2005, the company opened Imperial Valley Mall in El Centro, California, its first mall on the West Coast of the United States. In October 2005, the company acquired Oak Park Mall, Hickory Point Mall, and Eastland Mall for $516.9 million.

In 2007, the company acquired four malls in the St. Louis area from Westfield Group, for $1.03 billion. In 2011, the company acquired Northgate Mall in Chattanooga, Tennessee, which was built by its predecessor, Arlen Shopping Center Group, under the direction of Charles B. Lebovitz in 1972 and was later sold. In 2012, the company announced multimillion-dollar renovation of the property. In 2016, the Chesterfield Mall, went into receivership after the company defaulted on its mortgage loan. In January 2017, the company acquired five properties from Sears for $72.5 million in a leaseback transaction. In April 2017, the company was added to the S&P 600 index. In October 2017, the company rebranded itself as CBL Properties rather than "CBL & Associates Properties".

On March 20, 2019, the company settled a lawsuit that it overcharged tenants for electricity by setting aside a $90 million fund to be distributed to the plaintiffs. On November 1, 2020, CBL filed for Chapter 11 bankruptcy due to the COVID-19 pandemic's effects on malls.

References

External links

 
1978 establishments in Tennessee
1993 initial public offerings
American companies established in 1978
Companies based in Chattanooga, Tennessee
Companies listed on the New York Stock Exchange
Financial services companies established in 1978
Real estate investment trusts of the United States
Real estate companies established in 1978
Shopping center management firms
Companies that filed for Chapter 11 bankruptcy in 2020